Bricket Wood railway station is in the village of Bricket Wood, Hertfordshire, England, on the Abbey Line 3 miles (5 km) east of Watford Junction. The station and all trains serving it are operated by London Northwestern Railway, and the services operate with a 4-car Class 319.

History
The station once had a crossing loop and a second platform that could accommodate long excursion trains. Many Edwardian families from London came here to enjoy the fresh air, woodland, and two large funfairs that once stood nearby.

The station building, long disused, is the only surviving original building on the line. Responsibility for the line, including Bricket Wood, passed in November 2007 from Silverlink to London Midland.

The station was used in the films The Cuckoo Patrol,  Victoria the Great, Poison Pen, Double Confession, Night of the Demon, Impact and She'll Have to Go.

Emergency Railway Control Centre
In the 1950s, in response to fears of Soviet military action, plans were prepared for the construction of twenty-five atom-bomb-proof control bunkers away from expected target areas. Only five were completed; the one at Bricket Wood is situated in the trees between the station and Railway Cottages. It was built  1954 in order, in the event of war, to take over the running of the railway network from the London Euston control room.

As of 2014, only two remained in England. The control centre built at Bricket Wood is a post-war Standard District Control Building Type L built, measuring roughly 11m x 29m. Of reinforced concrete construction, it has a single protected doorway in each of the shorter walls. This would appear to be the sole surviving example of this type in England; one other survives in Scotland, at Burntisland.

Services
All services at Bricket Wood are operated by London Northwestern Railway. This is increased to a train approximately every 45 minutes in each direction during the peak hours. Services are typically operated using  EMUs.

Future
Installation of Oyster card readers on the stations along the branch is a possibility, although other ticketing options exist.

Restoration of the crossing loop, which would facilitate trains running every 30 minutes, is being considered by the local authorities and Network Rail.

References

External links

Bricket Wood station at abbeyline.org.uk

Railway stations in Hertfordshire
Former London and North Western Railway stations
Railway stations in Great Britain opened in 1858
Railway stations served by West Midlands Trains